The 2000 Food City 500 was a NASCAR Winston Cup Series stock car race held on March 26, 2000 at the Bristol Motor Speedway in Bristol, Tennessee.  Rusty Wallace of Penske-Kranefuss Racing won the race, his fiftieth career Cup victory.  Johnny Benson finished second and Ward Burton finished third.

Background 
The Bristol Motor Speedway is a 0.533-mile high bank concrete oval built in 1960 with the first Cup race run in 1961.  The straights are 650 feet long and, at the time, the corners were banked at 36 degrees and the straights banked at 18 degrees.

Jeff Gordon had one of the best cars and led the most laps, but after running into a tire left on the right side of Steve Park's pit box when leaving the pits on lap 386, he had to come down pit road a second time to repair damage to the left front fender.  He lost a lot of track position, fell back in traffic, and eventually finished 8th.

Johnny Benson got up to second place late in the race, but did not have enough to beat Rusty Wallace.  It was by far the best finish of the season for Benson and the best finish of his career at the time.  For Rusty, it was his 8th win at Bristol and his landmark 50th of his career.  It was his first win since the 1999 Food City 500, held a year prior.

Failed to qualify:  Dave Marcis (#71), Ricky Craven (#50), Ed Berrier (#90), Scott Pruett (#32)

Top 10 Results

Post-Race Championship Standings

References 
2000 NASCAR Winston Cup Series
NASCAR races at Bristol Motor Speedway
2000 in sports in Tennessee